The 2020–21 season was the 115th season in the existence of Olympique de Marseille and the club's 25th consecutive season in the top flight of French football. In addition to the domestic league, Marseille participated in this season's editions of the Coupe de France, the Trophée des Champions, and the UEFA Champions League. The season covered the period from 1 July 2020 to 30 June 2021.

Players

First-team squad

Out on loan

Transfers

In

Out

Pre-season and friendlies

Competitions

Overall record

Ligue 1

League table

Results summary

Results by round

Matches
The league fixtures were announced on 9 July 2020.

Coupe de France

Trophée des Champions

UEFA Champions League

Group stage

The group stage draw was held on 1 October 2020.

Statistics

Appearances and goals

|-
! colspan=14 style=background:#dcdcdc; text-align:center| Goalkeepers

|-
! colspan=14 style=background:#dcdcdc; text-align:center| Defenders

|-
! colspan=14 style=background:#dcdcdc; text-align:center| Midfielders

|-
! colspan=14 style=background:#dcdcdc; text-align:center| Forwards

|-
! colspan=14 style=background:#dcdcdc; text-align:center| Players transferred out during the season

Goalscorers

Notes

References

External links

Olympique de Marseille seasons
Olympique de Marseille
Olympique de Marseille